Glyptotermes chiraharitae is a termite species found from Malabar Wildlife Sanctuary, Kerala, India.

It has been named Chiraharitae after the Western Ghats, where it was spotted.

References

Glyptotermes
Insects of India